Daniele Cortis (also known as Elena) is a 1947 Italian drama film directed by Mario Soldati and starring Vittorio Gassman, Sarah Churchill and Gino Cervi. The film (set in nineteenth-century Italy) follows the impossible love affair between Elena, a noblewoman married to a man who doesn't understand her, and Daniele Cortis, her young cousin and Christian idealist. It is an adaptation of the 1885 novel of the same title by Antonio Fogazzaro.

Cast
 Vittorio Gassman as Daniele Cortis
 Sarah Churchill as Elena
 Gino Cervi as  Il marito di Elena
 Evi Maltagliati as Isa
 Gualtiero Tumiati as Aldo
 Rubi D'Alma as  Noemi
 Massimo Pianforini as Valentino
 Marco Tulli as Diego

Reception
From a contemporary review, the Monthly Film Bulletin review noted that the print was cut by about 35 minutes and featured "indifferent dubbing" and a "very poor print quality". The review found that with these issues the film was "incomprehensible", but the film was "an astonishing example of how completely such mutilation can change a film, which in this case was already of indifferent quality."

References

External links
 

1947 films
Italian historical drama films
Films scored by Nino Rota
1940s historical drama films
1940s Italian-language films
Films directed by Mario Soldati
Films set in the 19th century
Films based on Italian novels
Italian black-and-white films
1947 drama films
1940s Italian films